The 2013–14 Troy Trojans men's basketball team represented Troy University during the 2013–14 NCAA Division I men's basketball season. The Trojans, led by first year head coach Phil Cunningham, played their home games at Trojan Arena and were members of the Sun Belt Conference. They finished the season 11–20, 6–12 in Sun Belt play to finish in eighth place. They lost in the first round of the Sun Belt Conference tournament to Arkansas–Little Rock.

Roster

Schedule

|-
!colspan=9 style=""|  Exhibition

|-
!colspan=9 style=""|  Regular season

|-
!colspan=9 style=""|

References

Troy Trojans men's basketball seasons
Troy
2013 in sports in Alabama
2014 in sports in Alabama